Gordonville is a town in Lowndes County, Alabama, United States. At the 2010 census the population was 326, up from 318 in 2000. It is part of the Montgomery Metropolitan Statistical Area. It incorporated effective January 20, 1990.

Geography

Demographics

As of the census of 2000, there were 318 people, 112 households, and 84 families residing in the town. There were 129 housing units at an average density of 22.9 per square mile (8.8/km2). The racial makeup of the town was 95.91% Black or African American, 3.77% White and 0.31% Pacific Islander. 1.26% of the population were Hispanic or Latino of any race.

There were 112 households, out of which 30.4% had children under the age of 18 living with them, 39.3% were married couples living together, 33.9% had a female householder with no husband present, and 25.0% were non-families. 23.2% of all households were made up of individuals, and 8.0% had someone living alone who was 65 years of age or older. The average household size was 2.84 and the average family size was 3.38.

In the town, the population was spread out, with 28.0% under the age of 18, 9.7% from 18 to 24, 25.5% from 25 to 44, 20.4% from 45 to 64, and 16.4% who were 65 years of age or older. The median age was 35 years. For every 100 females, there were 97.5 males. For every 100 females age 18 and over, there were 92.4 males.

The median income for a household in the town was $10,278, and the median income for a family was $21,250. Males had a median income of $25,375 versus $22,292 for females. The per capita income for the town was $8,948. About 37.8% of families and 42.5% of the population were below the poverty line, including 38.0% of those under age 18 and 69.1% of those age 65 or over.

Notable person
 Francis Gordon Caffey, former United States federal judge

See also

 List of towns in Alabama

References

External links

Towns in Lowndes County, Alabama
Towns in Alabama
Montgomery metropolitan area